William Martin Chamberlain (born December 6, 1949) is a retired American professional basketball player in the American Basketball Association and the National Basketball Association.

He played for the Memphis Tams and Kentucky Colonels (1972–73) of the ABA and the Phoenix Suns (1973–74) of the NBA.

External links
ABA & NBA stats @ basketballreference.com

1949 births
Living people
American men's basketball players
Basketball players from New York (state)
Golden State Warriors draft picks
Kentucky Colonels players
Memphis Tams players
North Carolina Tar Heels men's basketball players
Parade High School All-Americans (boys' basketball)
Phoenix Suns players
People from Brookville, New York
Small forwards